Steven Douglas Symms (born April 23, 1938) is an American politician and lobbyist who served as a four-term congressman (1973–81) and two-term U.S. Senator (1981–93), representing Idaho. He is a partner at Parry, Romani, DeConcini & Symms, a lobbying firm in Washington, D.C.

Early life and education
Symms attended public schools in Canyon County and graduated from Caldwell High School in 1956. He studied horticulture at the University of Idaho in Moscow, where he was a reserve center on the football team and was a member of Sigma Nu fraternity. He graduated in 1960 with a B.S. in agriculture, then served in the United States Marine Corps for three years, after which he worked as a private pilot and apple farmer. From 1969 to 1972, he was co-editor of the college newspaper, The Idaho Compass.

Career

Congress 
In 1972, Symms ran for Congress, highlighting his career as an apple farmer by using the slogan "Take a bite out of big government!" He was elected to the open seat in the United States House of Representatives at age 34 and was re-elected three times. He ran for the United States Senate in 1980. Aided by national funding, he unseated four-term incumbent Democrat Frank Church, winning by less than one percent. Symms was re-elected in 1986, defeating Democratic Governor John V. Evans in another hard-fought and close election.

Symms was one of several Republican senators who, in 1981, called into the White House to express discontent over the nomination of Sandra Day O'Connor to the Supreme Court; the opposition hinged over the issue of O'Connor's presumed unwillingness to overturn Roe v. Wade.

During the 1988 U.S. presidential election, Symms claimed in a radio interview that a photograph existed from the 1960s showing Kitty Dukakis, the wife of Democratic presidential candidate Michael Dukakis, burning an American flag to protest the Vietnam War. Kitty Dukakis angrily denied the accusation as "totally false and beneath contempt," and Symms later admitted that he could not substantiate it. Nevertheless, the claim became national news, as media outlets began searching for the photograph Symms said he had "heard" about. The flag-burning story was one of several false rumors about Dukakis that circulated during the 1988 campaign. "Mr. Symms's comment was the third time in a few days that prominent Republicans have publicly aired allegations that the Democrats have swiftly rebutted," The New York Times reported.

According to Salon magazine, during Symms' time in Washington, he "gained something of a sexual legend over his eight years in the House that grew larger once he was in the Senate; it was widely known among reporters that he was a big-time D.C. party animal and could be seen most evenings in the company of a woman other than his wife, Fran. She in fact was a kind, sweet woman who suffered terribly from arthritis and couldn't socialize much. Most of the state's political reporters knew about the situation but figured it was no one's business unless Symms made it an issue. However, when Fran finally had enough and divorced him, the emergent details of his philandering - and the ensuing shelled-out poll numbers - persuaded him to not pursue reelection in 1992."

Symms was also one of the six senators who voted against the Americans With Disabilities Act of 1990.

Symms chose not to seek a third term in 1992 and was succeeded by the Republican mayor of Boise, Dirk Kempthorne, a future two-term Idaho governor and United States Secretary of the Interior.

Later career 
After leaving the U.S. Senate in 1993, Symms founded Symms, Lehn Associates, Inc., a consulting firm. In January 1999, he partnered with John Haddow and formed Symms & Haddow Associates, a lobbying firm. In January 2001, the firm joined forces with Romano Romani and former Senator Dennis DeConcini of Parry, Romani & DeConcini to form Parry, Romani, DeConcini & Symms.

Personal life
Prior to his senior year at the University of Idaho, Symms married Frances E. "Fran" Stockdale of Helena, Montana, in August 1959. They had four children, a son and three daughters. Following his re-election in 1986, the couple separated, and their divorce was finalized in 1990. Although Symms declined to comment on the reason for the divorce, he was dogged by rumors of infidelity during his 1980s campaigns, claims which were eventually substantiated by his former wife. Symms married Loretta Mathes Fuller in 1992, a former aide and later the Deputy Sergeant of Arms of the U.S. Senate.

Symms is a cousin of former Oregon congressman Denny Smith.

Elections

References

External links
 
 Lobby Congress.com – biography from Parry, Romani DeConcini & Symms
 Steve Symms at SourceWatch
 

American lobbyists
Farmers from Idaho
Journalists from Idaho
United States Marine Corps officers
University of Idaho alumni
Idaho Vandals football players
American aviators
People from Caldwell, Idaho
1938 births
Living people
Republican Party United States senators from Idaho
Republican Party members of the United States House of Representatives from Idaho
People from Nampa, Idaho
Members of Congress who became lobbyists